Al-Dhuluiya Sport Club is an Iraqi football team based in Dhuluiya, Saladin, that plays in Iraq Division Three.

Stadium
In March 2017, the Ministry of Youth and Sports decided to reconstruct Al-Dhuluiya Stadium, as it was badly damaged by ISIS terrorist acts.

Managerial history
  Emad Nayef
  Haitham Rashad

References

External links
 Iraq Clubs- Foundation Dates

1991 establishments in Iraq
Association football clubs established in 1991
Football clubs in Saladin